Coprates Chasma is a huge canyon in the Coprates quadrangle of Mars, located at 13.4° south latitude and 61.4° west longitude, part of the Valles Marineris canyon system. It was named from the classical Greek name for the Dez River in Persia. 

Eastward from here there is about a 0.03 degree upward slope before reaching the outflow channels, which means that if you filled the canyon with fluid, it would create a lake with a depth of  before the fluid would overflow out onto the northern plains.

Keith Harrison and Mary Chapman described strong evidence for a lake in the eastern part of Valles Marineris, especially in Coprates Chasma. It would have had an average depth of only 842 m—much smaller than the 5–10 km depth of parts of Valles Marineris. Still, its volume of 110,000 cubic miles would be comparable to Earth’s Caspian and Black Seas. The main evidence for such a lake is the presence of benches at the level that models show is where the lake level should be. Also, the low point in Eos Chasma where water would be expected to overflow is marked by fluvial features. The features look like the flow came together at a small point and carried out significant erosion.

The bottom of the Coprates Chasma contain a large field of small pitted cones which have been interpreted as Martian equivalents of terrestrial igneous or mud volcanoes.

Recurrent slope lineae

Recurrent slope lineae are small dark streaks on slopes that elongate in warm seasons.  They may be evidence of liquid water.

Gallery

See also
 Lakes on Mars

References

Coprates quadrangle
Valleys and canyons on Mars